Ababsa (also written El Ababsa) is a suburb in the commune of Bayadha, in Bayadha District, El Oued Province, Algeria. It is part of the urban area of El Oued.

References

Neighbouring towns and cities

Populated places in El Oued Province